The Autovía A-92N is a highway in Spain. It goes from Guadix (Granada) to the limit of Andalusia with Murcia, where the highway connects with the A-91.

References

Autopistas and autovías in Spain
Transport in Andalusia